Tampering with evidence, or evidence tampering, is an act in which a person alters, conceals, falsifies, or destroys evidence with the intent to interfere with an investigation (usually) by a law-enforcement, governmental, or regulatory authority.  It is a criminal offense in many jurisdictions.

Tampering with evidence is closely related to the legal issue of spoliation of evidence, which is usually the civil law or due process version of the same concept (but may itself be a crime).  Tampering with evidence is also closely related to obstruction of justice and perverting the course of justice, and these two kinds of crimes are often charged together.  The goal of tampering with evidence is usually to cover up a crime or with intent to injure the accused person.

Spoliation
Spoliation of evidence is the intentional, reckless, or negligent withholding, hiding, altering, fabricating, or destroying of evidence relevant to a legal proceeding.

The spoliation inference is a negative evidentiary inference that a finder of fact can draw from a party's destruction of a document or thing that is relevant to an ongoing or reasonably foreseeable civil or criminal proceeding: the finder of fact can review all evidence uncovered in as strong a light as possible against the spoliator and in favor of the opposing party.

However, in U.S. federal courts, updates to the Federal Rules of Civil Procedure in 2015 have resulted in significant decline in spoliation sanctions.

Theory
The theory of the spoliation inference is that when a party destroys evidence, it may be reasonable to infer that the party had "consciousness of guilt" or other motivation to avoid the evidence.  Therefore, the factfinder may conclude that the evidence would have been unfavorable to the spoliator.  Some jurisdictions have recognized a spoliation tort action, which allows the victim of destruction of evidence to file a separate tort action against a spoliator.

By law enforcement
When police confiscate or destroy a citizen's photographs or recordings of officers' misconduct, the police's act of destroying the evidence may be prosecuted as an act of evidence tampering, if the recordings being destroyed are potential evidence in a criminal or regulatory investigation of the officers themselves.

See also
 Contempt of court
 Cover-up
 Discovery (law)
 E-discovery
 Evidence packaging
 Spoliation in fire investigation
 Illegal disposal of bodies in the water
 Legal hold
 Obstruction of justice
 Perverting the course of justice
 Police misconduct
 Security bag

References

Further reading

 
American legal terminology
Searches and seizures
Police misconduct
Obstruction of justice